Paulus Hendrikus Martinus van Boekel (born 19 September 1975) is a  Dutch international referee, who refereed at the 2014 FIFA World Cup qualifiers, beginning with the match between Moldova and England.

Van Boekel became a FIFA referee in 2008.

Controversial calls
On 7 July 2021, he was the Video Assistant Referee (VAR) for the Euro 2020 semifinal match between England and Denmark.  Controversially, he chose to uphold referee Danny Makkelie's decision to award a penalty for a foul on Raheem Sterling of England.

On 26 October  2022 he was the Video Assistant Referee (VAR) for the 2022-2023 UEFA Champions League Group stage match between Tottenham Hotspur and Sporting CP, he controversially ruled out Harry Kane’s injury time winner which would have meant Tottenham went through to the round of 16 in the Champions league.

References

1975 births
Living people
Dutch football referees
People from Venray
VVV-Venlo players
Association football defenders
Dutch footballers
Eerste Divisie players
Footballers from Limburg (Netherlands)